Fausto de Sousa Correia (October 29, 1951 – 9 October 2007) was a Portuguese politician, deputy of the Portuguese Parliament, and Member of the European Parliament (MEP) for the Socialist Party; part of the Party of European Socialists.

Biography
Born and raised in Coimbra, Fausto Correia earned a degree in law from the University of Coimbra. In his early years, Correia was journalist at the newspaper República.

Government of Portugal
As a member of the Portuguese Government headed by Prime-Minister António Guterres, in the early 2000s Correia played a major part in the establishment of the Loja do Cidadão (The Citizen's Shop), a one-stop-shop intended to improve quality in public services, and aimed to develop a new philosophy of more efficient and modern public service throughout the major cities of Portugal.

European Parliament
He was elected as a candidate of the Socialist Party to the European Parliament in the European Parliament elections.

Chairmanships
He was a former chairman of the Associação Académica de Coimbra - O.A.F. (in 1995), the major football club of Coimbra, and RDP, the state-managed public radio network of Portugal.

Death
He died of a heart attack on 9 October 2007, in Brussels. He had been living and working in Belgium as a member of the European Parliament since 2004.

1951 births
2007 deaths
MEPs for Portugal 2004–2009
Socialist Party (Portugal) MEPs
Socialist Party (Portugal) politicians
Members of the Assembly of the Republic (Portugal)
People from Coimbra
University of Coimbra alumni